Andrei Syarheyevich Skabeika (born 11 June 1995) is a Belarusian athlete specialising in the high jump. He won the silver medal at the 2013 European Junior Championships.

In 2019, he won the silver medal in the team event at the 2019 European Games held in Minsk, Belarus.

His personal bests in the event are 2.26 metres outdoors (Brest 2014) and 2.26 metres indoors (Gomel 2018).

International competitions

References

1995 births
Living people
Belarusian male high jumpers
Competitors at the 2019 Summer Universiade
Athletes (track and field) at the 2019 European Games
European Games medalists in athletics
European Games silver medalists for Belarus